Zargar (Russian and Tajik: Заргар) is a village and jamoat in Tajikistan. It is located in Kushoniyon District in Khatlon Region. The jamoat has a total population of 49,235 (2015).

Notes

References

Populated places in Khatlon Region
Jamoats of Tajikistan